The 2019 World Weightlifting Championships was held in Pattaya, Thailand from 18 to 27 September 2019.

On September 12, Egypt was banned from competing at these Championships due to multiple doping offenses. The host nation, Thailand, was also banned from the Championships for the same reason.

Medal summary

Men

Women

Medal table
Ranking by Big (Total result) medals

Ranking by all medals: Big (Total result) and Small (Snatch and Clean & Jerk)

Team ranking

Men

Women

Participating nations
A total of 588 competitors from 97 nations participated.

 (4)
 (2)
 (9)
 (5)
 (2)
 (3)
 (2)
 (13)
 (2)
 (2)
 (8)
 (6)
 (1)
 (18)
 (5)
 (20)
 (14)
 (16)
 (6)
 (4)
 (8)
 (10)
 (5)
 (10)
 (2)
 (5)
 (8)
 (10)
 (7)
 (1)
 (14)
 (2)
 (2)
 (3)
 (2)
 (7)
 (8)
 (14)
 (4)
 (4)
 (5)
 (9)
 (20)
 (9)
 (2)
 (2)
 (4)
 (1)
 (2)
 (4)
 (4)
 (6)
 (1)
 (1)
 (1)
 (11)
 (5)
 (5)
 (3)
 (1)
 (3)
 (1)
 (12)
 (6)
 (3)
 (5)
 (9)
 (6)
 (6)
 (1)
 (4)
 (16)
 (1)
 (4)
 (4)
 (1)
 (4)
 (2)
 (4)
 (19)
 (7)
 (8)
 (2)
 (2)
 (1)
 (2)
 (2)
 (12)
 (14)
 (1)
 (10)
 (1)
 (20)
 (2)
 (10)
 (12)
 (7)

References

External links
IWF website 
Results 
Results book 

 
World Weightlifting Championships
World Championships
Weightlifting Championships
Weightlifting Championships
Sports competitions in Pattaya
World Weightlifting Championships